{{Infobox comics character
| character_name = Harley Quinn
| image          = Classic and modern Harley Quinn.png
| imagesize     =  270
| caption        = The classic and modern iterations of Harley Quinn, art by Terry Dodson
| real_name      = Harleen Frances Quinzel
| publisher      = DC Comics
| first_series   = Batman: The Animated Series"Joker's Favor" (September 11, 1992)'
| first_comic    = The Batman Adventures #12 (September 1993, non-canon)Batman: Harley Quinn #1 (October 1999, canon)
| creators       = Paul DiniBruce Timm
| species        = Human
| homeworld      = Brooklyn / Gotham City
| alliances      = Suicide SquadGotham City SirensQuinntetsGang of HarleysSecret SixJustice League of AnarchyBatman family
| aliases        = Dr. Harleen Quinzel Holly ChanceDr. Jessica Seaborn
| partners       = Joker Poison Ivy Bud and Lou
| powers         = * Genius-level intellect
 Enhanced strength, stamina, durability, agility, and reflexes
 Toxic immunity
 Underwater breathing
 Access to gag weapons
| cat            = super
| subcat         = DC Comics
| hero           = y
| villain        = y
}}
Harley Quinn is a character appearing in American comic books published by DC Comics. Quinn was created by Paul Dini and Bruce Timm as a comic relief henchwoman for the supervillain Joker in Batman: The Animated Series, and debuted in its 22nd episode, "Joker's Favor", on September 11, 1992. While intended to appear in one episode, Quinn became a recurring character within the DC Animated Universe as the Joker's sidekick and love interest, and was adapted into DC Comics' Batman comic book canon seven years later, beginning with the one-shot Batman: Harley Quinn #1 (October 1999). Quinn's origin story features her as a former psychiatrist at Gotham City's Arkham Asylum named Dr. Harleen Quinzel who fell in love with the Joker, her patient, eventually becoming his accomplice and lover. The character's alias is a play on the stock character Harlequin from the 16th-century theater .

Following her introduction to the DC Universe in 1999, Harley Quinn was depicted as the sidekick and lover of the Joker as well as the criminal associate and best friend of fellow supervillain Poison Ivy. Later stories depicted Quinn as a supervillain who has left her abusive relationship with the Joker behind, beginning with the publication of her first ongoing series written by Karl Kesel in 2000. After years of scarce appearances in comics, Quinn returned in a leading role in 2009 with the Gotham City Sirens series, as part of an unstable alliance with Poison Ivy and Catwoman. In 2011, DC's line-wide reboot The New 52 reintroduced Quinn in the relaunched Suicide Squad title, which changed the character's personality, design, and origin, replacing her original jester costume with a revealing ensemble and depicting her to be darker than her earlier counterpart. The character took a lighthearted and humorous direction with her second ongoing series in 2013, written by Amanda Conner and Jimmy Palmiotti, which features the character moving to her hometown of Brooklyn and starting her own life in Coney Island. The character has since been depicted as an antihero independent of the Joker and a recurring core member of the Suicide Squad, with Poison Ivy becoming her primary romantic interest. In 2021, DC's line-wide Infinite Frontier relaunch brought Quinn back to Gotham City and reestablished her as a superhero seeking redemption for her past actions.

Harley Quinn's abilities include expert gymnastic skills, proficiency in weapons and hand-to-hand combat, complete unpredictability, immunity to toxins, and enhanced strength, agility, and durability. Quinn often wields clown-themed gag weapons, with an oversized mallet being her signature weapon. The character has a pair of pet hyenas, Bud and Lou, which sometimes serve as her attack dogs. As a trained psychiatrist with a genius-level intellect, she is adept at deception and psychological manipulation.

Harley Quinn has become one of DC Comics' most popular and profitable characters, and has been featured in many of DC's comic books and adapted in various other media and merchandise. DC Comics Publisher Jim Lee considers Harley Quinn the fourth pillar of DC Comics' publishing line, behind Superman, Batman, and Wonder Woman.

Originally voiced by Arleen Sorkin in the DC Animated Universe, she has since appeared in many other DC projects voiced by actresses such as Tara Strong, Hynden Walch, Laura Bailey, Jenny Slate, Melissa Rauch, Laura Post, and Kaley Cuoco; the latter provided the character's voice in the 2019 animated series Harley Quinn. Mia Sara portrayed the character in the 2002 television series Birds of Prey. Harley Quinn makes her live-action cinematic debut in the DC Extended Universe (DCEU) film Suicide Squad (2016), where she is portrayed by Margot Robbie. Robbie reprises her role in Birds of Prey (2020) and The Suicide Squad (2021), with elements of her portrayal's design consequentially incorporated into comics, while Lady Gaga will portray the character in Joker: Folie à Deux (2024).

History
Creation and development

Harley Quinn was created by Paul Dini and Bruce Timm for the 1992 Batman: The Animated Series episode entitled "Joker's Favor" while Dini was writing the episode. Initially written as an animated equivalent of a walk-on role, Harley Quinn was intended to appear in just one episode. As Dini was putting together the story for the episode, he wanted to introduce a foil for the supervillain the Joker that would emphasize the Joker's comic book personality traits: funny, scary, and egotistical. He then thought of giving Joker a henchwoman, inspired by the molls of the 1960s live-action Batman series, and then decided she would be a "funny counterpart to the Joker to maybe work up a little Punch and Judy attitude between them"; Dini stated, "[...] she could crack a joke and the henchmen would laugh, and the Joker would kind of glare at her." In 1991, after seeing his college friend Arleen Sorkin play a jester from a dream sequence in the soap opera Days of Our Lives, Dini decided to have Sorkin voice her. Dini then partly based Harley Quinn on Sorkin, with Dini incorporating aspects of Sorkin, such as her "very snappy, wisecracking, bubbly blonde" personality into the character as well as her mannerisms. In recording Harley Quinn's voice, Sorkin spoke in her normal Brooklyn accent while putting in a "little Yiddish sound", since Dini made the character Jewish, another aspect of the character borrowed from Sorkin.

Dini had several names in mind while naming the character, such as Columbine, and eventually settled on the name "Harley Quinn". Dini chose the name for the character to be in line with other Batman characters's names being puns, and also because he thought "Harley was a fun name for a girl." The name Harley Quinn is a play on Harlequin, a  stock character from the sixteenth-century Italian physical comedy theater .

In designing the character, Timm did a "simplified supervillain version" of traditional Harlequin gear; from the  original, he took the jester hat, ruffled collar, diamond pattern, and domino mask and put them on a red-and-black bodysuit, on which the diamonds were strategically placed for easier animation. Timm took Harley Quinn's red and black motif from the Golden Age comic book character Daredevil. Dini had previously made a rough design for the character, which Timm improved on.

Expanded role

After seeing Harley Quinn in the rough cut of "Joker's Favor", the producers of Batman: The Animated Series, which include Dini and Timm, were impressed with the result, with Dini wanting to bring the character back for more episodes. Timm and another producer, Alan Burnett, were initially reluctant of this, and thought that giving Joker a girlfriend "played more towards his comedic side" and would "humanize him too much", which contrasted their vision for Joker as a character who is "as serious a threat as possible to Batman". Nevertheless, months after "Joker's Favor", Harley made a second appearance on the show in the episode "The Laughing Fish" and became the Joker's love interest. Harley Quinn gained popularity with fans of The Animated Series, with the character being featured more on the show and eventually starring in her own episodes, such as 1993's "Harley and Ivy", which introduced a friendship between Harley Quinn and fellow supervillain Poison Ivy, and 1994's "Harlequinade" and "Harley's Holiday", which explored Harley Quinn's life without the Joker. Harley Quinn then became a recurring character in the DC Animated Universe, appearing in The Animated Series sequel The New Batman Adventures, and in non-Batman animation such as Superman: The Animated Series, Static Shock, and Justice League. On February 7, 1994, she made her first appearance in a video game in The Adventures of Batman and Robin, an action platformer based on Batman: The Animated Series.

Transition to comic books

Because of her popularity, Harley Quinn was adapted into DC's comic books. In September 1993, a year following Harley Quinn's first appearance in Batman: The Animated Series, the character made her comic book debut in the 12th issue of The Batman Adventures, a series set in the universe of The Animated Series, and became a regular character. In 1997, she appeared in the story Batman: Thrillkiller, released under Elseworlds, a DC Comics imprint that published out-of-continuity alternate reality stories, as Hayley Fitzpatrick. In 1999, she became a canonical character with the release of Batman: Harley Quinn.

Origin story

In February 1994, the one-shot The Batman Adventures: Mad Love recounting Harley's origin was released. Written by Dini and drawn by Timm, the story marks their first comic book collaboration.  Mad Love introduces Harley Quinn as a former psychiatrist named Harleen Quinzel who fell in love with the Joker during her internship at Gotham City's Arkham Asylum and details her transformation into the Joker's villainous accomplice Harley Quinn, as well as the Joker's lack of respect for Harley. Widely considered the definitive Harley Quinn story, Mad Love added dimensions to the character, with Dini introducing Harley Quinn's motivations as well as establishing her as a tragic figure and sympathetic villain. The story received wide praise and won the Eisner and Harvey awards for Best Single Issue in the same year and was later adapted into an episode of the same name in The New Batman Adventures in 1999.

Name origin
Harley Quinn's actual name is established in Mad Love as Harleen Frances Quinzel. "Harleen Frances" was borrowed by Dini from Sorkin's first and middle name, Arleen Frances. "Quinzel" came from one of Dini's former Emerson College instructors, who was surnamed Quenzel.

Introduction to mainstream DC continuity
Harley Quinn was adapted into the mainstream DC Universe with the 1999 one-shot graphic novel Batman: Harley Quinn, written by Dini and illustrated by Yvel Guichet., which put her origin in the middle of the "No Man's Land" story line. Dini changed Harley and the Joker's relationship to be darker to match the Joker's character in the comics; in the story, the Joker attempts to kill Harley at the first opportunity. Dini also gave Harley new abilities, such as immunity to toxins and enhanced strength and agility, which she received after having been injected a special formula by Poison Ivy. These changes were made to match the needs of the DC Universe; on her new abilities, Dini said: "I figured if she'd be going head-to-head with Batman and the other DC heroes, Harley would need some kind of physical edge."

First ongoing series

While pursuing new assignments at DC Comics' offices in New York City, Karl Kesel was approached by former DC editor Matt Idelson to create a pitch for Harley Quinn's first ongoing series, which Karl accepted, being a fan of the character after having read Dini's Mad Love. Kesel chose Terry Dodson as the artist for the series, whose art Kesel thought complemented the character's cartoonish roots and worldview. Kesel called Dodson and asked him if he was interested on working on the comic, to which Dodson agreed, and the two worked for a month on their proposal for the series, which was to make a comic about "love gone horribly, terribly wrong". The proposal was accepted by DC Comics, and the pair began work on the series, with Kesel and Dodson both being involved in the storytelling, and Dodson bringing in his wife, Rachel Dodson, to ink. Kesel's run on the series began being published in December 2000, and was about Harley Quinn leaving the Joker and becoming a solo criminal, alongside a supporting cast of henchmen named the Quinntets. Because of underwhelming sales, his 25-issue run ended in December 2002, and DC decided to change the creative team; the series was given to writer A.J. Lieberman and artists Mike Huddleston and Troy Nixey by Idelson, and took on a grittier and darker direction, contrasting Kesel's run. The decision renewed interest in the character, but the sales remained lackluster and the series was cancelled in 2003.

Gotham City Sirens

After years of scarce appearances in comics, Harley Quinn resurfaced in a leading role in July 2009 with Gotham City Sirens, a team-up title created by Dini. The series brought together Batman's most popular female villains, Harley Quinn, Catwoman, and Poison Ivy, in an unstable alliance. The series also expanded on Harley Quinn's background and early life; in Gotham City Sirens #7, Dini established the character's hometown being Brooklyn, and also introduced her dysfunctional family, with her swindling father being described as the main reason for her pursuing psychiatry.

The first several issues of Gotham City Sirens were written by Dini and illustrated by Guillem March. Other creatives who worked for the series include writers Tony Bedard and Peter Calloway, and artists David López, Andres Guinaldo, Peter Nguyen, Jeremy Haun, and Ramon Bachs. The series was cancelled in August 2011 for The New 52, DC Comics' relaunch of their entire comic line.

The New 52
Suicide Squad

As part of the New 52 reboot in September 2011, Harley Quinn was reintroduced by Adam Glass as a prominent member of the supervillain team Task Force X in the relaunched Suicide Squad series. The character was heavily redesigned to fit the tone of the book; her color motif was changed to red and blue, her jester costume was replaced with a revealing ensemble consisting of a corset and hot pants, her skin was bleached white, and her previously blonde hair was altered to half-blue and half-red. Her personality had also been depicted to be more violent and psychopathic than her former iteration.

In the series, Glass separated Harley Quinn from the Joker and explored her "becom[ing] her own person", with the Suicide Squad becoming a family to her; Glass stated, "Harley's always wanted to belong to something. And if not Joker, then the team – and she's finding herself in all this. She's finding her place in the world, that she's not just a sidekick."Suicide Squad was cancelled in April 2014 to coincide with the conclusion of the "Forever Evil" storyline.

New origin
In the seventh issue of Suicide Squad, Glass revised Harley Quinn's origin story, making it reflect the Joker's origins. In the story, the Joker takes Harleen Quinzel to the chemical plant where he originated and pushes her into a vat of chemicals against her will, which bleaches her skin and drives her insane, resulting in her transformation to Harley Quinn, similar to the Joker's transformation in his origins. This origin was received negatively by fans of the character, who felt that its removal of Harley Quinn's choice to become the Joker's accomplice herself, as depicted in her previous origin stories, took out an essential part of her character.

Second ongoing series

Harley Quinn's second ongoing series, written by husband and wife Jimmy Palmiotti and Amanda Conner, with the interior art illustrated by Chad Hardin and John Timms, explored Harley Quinn leaving Gotham City and starting her own life in her hometown of Brooklyn, depicting her as a landlord in Coney Island, where she shares an apartment building with a supporting cast of "sideshow freaks". Considered to be the most defining writers to work on the character since Dini and Timm, Palmiotti and Conner reinvented Harley Quinn as an antihero who has left her controlling relationship with the Joker behind.

In contrast to Harley Quinn's depiction in Glass' Suicide Squad, Palmiotti and Conner wrote Harley Quinn with a lighthearted, cartoonish, and humorous tone. Her costume has also been changed with a roller derby-inspired costume designed by Conner, which incorporates Conner's favorite aspects of Harley Quinn's early costume and her costume in Glass' film Suicide Squad. The series also brought back Harley Quinn's red and black motif.

The series began being published in November 2013, starting with Harley Quinn #0, which brought together 17 comic book artists, including Harley Quinn co-creator Bruce Timm, to illustrate a fourth wall-breaking story about Harley thinking of the artists that could illustrate her in her own comic book series. The rest of the series details Harley Quinn's adventures in Coney Island with her supporting cast. In Harley Quinn #25, Palmiotti and Conner reunited Harley Quinn with the Joker; the story depicts Harley Quinn returning to Gotham City to confront the Joker and end their relationship.

With Harley Quinn's longtime friend Poison Ivy being a recurring character in the series, Palmiotti and Conner built on their relationship and hinted at romantic feelings between the two characters; Poison Ivy is shown kissing Harley Quinn multiple times throughout the series, and a sexual relationship between them was alluded to in issue #25. When asked regarding their relationship in a Twitter Q&A, Palmiotti and Conner replied, "Yes, they are girlfriends without the jealousy of monogamy."

The New 52 Harley Quinn series received positive reception, and was also one of DC Comics' top-selling series, inspiring multiple spin-offs. The series was ended for the DC Rebirth relaunch of DC's titles.

Controversies
The cover of the first issue of the New 52s Suicide Squad title drew controversy for its oversexualized depiction of Harley Quinn. This also caused some fans of the character to send Glass hatemail and personal threats.

In September 2013, DC Comics announced an art contest entitled "Break into comics with Harley Quinn!", in which contestants were to draw Harley in four different suicide scenarios. This contest drew controversy not only because it was announced close to National Suicide Prevention Week, but because some artists did not like the sexualized portrayal of Harley Quinn in the fourth scenario, in which the character attempts suicide while naked in her bathtub. The American Foundation for Suicide Prevention, American Psychiatric Association, and National Alliance on Mental Illness all responded to the controversy in an emailed group statement to the Huffington Post, stating, "We are disappointed that DC Comics has decided to host a contest looking for artists to develop ways to depict suicide attempts by one of its main villains – Harley Quinn". After seeing the reactions to the contest, DC Comics apologized, saying they should have made it clear it was a dream sequence that was not supposed to be taken seriously. In the final version, the bathtub scene was cut and replaced with Harley Quinn sitting on a rocket while flying in space.

DC Rebirth
In June 2016, the DC Rebirth event relaunched DC Comics' entire line of comic book titles. Both Harley Quinn as well as Suicide Squad were rebooted, with the latter starting with the one-shot issue Suicide Squad: Rebirth #1 (October 2016). Harley Quinn's DC Rebirth design included pink and blue dyed hair tips and a jacket inspired by Margot Robbie's portrayal of the character in the 2016 film Suicide Squad, a change established in the last issues of her New 52 series.

Harley Quinn returns as a regular character in the relaunched Suicide Squad series, written by Rob Williams. The series was cancelled in January 2019.

Harley Quinn's relaunched ongoing series is a direct continuation of the former, with Conner and Palmiotti still writing for the character, and Hardin and Timms illustrating the interior art. After having written 64 issues of Harley Quinn's ongoing series, Conner and Palmiotti's five-year run ended with the 34th issue of the series in December 2017, with writer Frank Tieri and artist Inaki Miranda taking over the title. Tieri's run on the series ended with the series' 42nd issue, followed by a two-issue storyline written by Christopher Sebela and illustrated by Mirka Andolfo. By issue #45 in July 2018, Sam Humphries was the new writer for the series, with John Timms returning to provide art. The series ended in August 2020.

Harley Loves Joker
In 2017, Harley Quinn co-creator Paul Dini wrote a backup feature for Harley Quinn's Rebirth monthly series entitled Harley Loves Joker, co-written by Palmiotti and illustrated by Bret Blevins, which ran for 9 issues. The story brought back Harley Quinn's classic characterization and focuses on her past with the Joker. Unlike her characterization in Batman: The Animated Series, Dini and Palmiotti wrote Harley Quinn in the story as less of a "doormat", with Harley Quinn and Joker being on equal footing in their relationship. The story concluded with the two-part limited series of the same name, which also expanded on Harley Quinn's past as a former intern in animal research at S.T.A.R. Labs, where she met her pet hyenas Bud and Lou. In the second part of the story, Dini and Palmiotti explained Harley Quinn's change in costume, establishing the character's modern design as a reflection of her having left her relationship with the Joker.

Infinite Frontier

For the 2021 Infinite Frontier relaunch, Harley Quinn is moved back to Gotham City as a superheroine, where she frequently interacts with and aids the Batman family, and she is given a new design by Riley Rossmo. Harley Quinn's fourth ongoing series, written by Stephanie Phillips and illustrated by Rossmo, depicts her "actively looking to make up for her past sins", alongside a former Joker henchman named Kevin. Harley Quinn also has a prominent role in the "Fear State" crossover event.

Powers, abilities, and equipment
Harley Quinn has no superpowers, and relies on her unpredictability, gymnastics skills, and weapons and hand-to-hand proficiency. She is a peak athlete, having won a gymnastics scholarship at Gotham City's Gotham State University. Following her transition to main DC canon in 1999, Harley Quinn was established as having immunity to toxins and enhanced strength, agility, durability, and reflexes, which she received after having been injected a serum concocted by Poison Ivy. "Vengeance Unlimited, Part Five" (Harley Quinn vol. 1 #30) revealed that it also gave her the ability to breathe underwater.

Harley Quinn is skilled in using various weapons, often employing weaponized clown-themed gag items, including pop guns, rubber chickens, and a gun that shoots a boxing glove, as well as oversized pistols and mallets, the latter being her signature weapon. Other weapons she uses include: unconventional weapons, such as a baseball bat; explosive weapons such as bazookas, customized bombs, and dynamites; firearms, such as pistols, assault rifles, and machine guns; Harley Quinn also has a pair of pet hyenas, Bud and Lou, which she can order to attack her opponents.

Despite being mentally unstable and sometimes distracted, Harley is highly intelligent. Her intellect extends to her psychological, tactical and deception abilities, but she does not stand out for particular strategic or scientific skills and often remains subordinate to the Joker, who between the two is the genius and the inventor. Harleen Quinzel earned a bachelor's degree in psychology and as a former Arkham psychiatrist, was highly qualified in psychoanalysis, criminology, and forensic psychiatry. While not on par with Joker, she is still an expert tactician, deceiver and escapologist, and still shows traces of her psychological experience. Harley Quinn is the only person besides the Joker to concoct Joker Venom, the Joker's signature weapon, and is shown to have reverse-engineered its formula and developed an antitoxin. She also has an indomitable pathological will. 

Just like Poison Ivy, sometimes and not as much, Harley uses her feminine charm to attract men but only to manipulate them. Unlike the Joker, she is able to simulate sanity, thus being able to pretend to be a "normal" person. In this way, she disguised herself as a security guard, a lawyer and even Poison Ivy and Batgirl.

Romantic interests
Harley Quinn has had several love interests, the most notable being the Joker and Poison Ivy. Other love interests include Mason Macabre, a character created by Conner and Palmiotti. Plastic Man was initially intended to be a love interest for Harley Quinn by Kesel, but was not approved by DC.
The Joker

The Joker is Harley Quinn's former lover. Harley's solo comics often explores her former association with the Joker through "flashbacks of their past exploits, present-day conflicts", or through Harley as she "laments his absence". Harley often refers to him as "Mistah J" and "Puddin'".

Their relationship is known for its abusive and codependent nature, first established in Harley's first origin story Mad Love. The Joker habitually abuses Harley, and despite the abuse, Harley Quinn returns to him. In the 1999 one-shot comic Batman: Harley Quinn, the Joker decides to kill Harley, after admitting that he does care for her, that their relationship is romantic, and that these feelings prevent him from fulfilling his purpose. Dini describes their relationship as abusive, and empathizes with Harley's feelings of abandonment, with Dini basing most of Harley's dialogue on his past experiences.

The Joker's controlling and codependent relationship with Harley Quinn has been analyzed as a means of the Joker reinforcing his own belief in his power in a world where he may be killed or neutralized by another villain or Batman. Joker mirrors his identity through Harley in her appearance, and even though he may ignore or act indifferent towards her, he continues to try to subject her to his control. When Harley successfully defeats Batman in Mad Love (1994), the Joker, emasculated by his own failure, severely injures her out of fear of what the other villains will think of him; however, while Harley recovers, the Joker sends her flowers, which she accepts, reasserting his control over her.

Poison Ivy

 
Poison Ivy is Harley Quinn's current love interest and best friend, and Harley often refers to her as "Red". Ivy was first introduced as a new friend to Harley by Dini in the 1993 Batman: The Animated Series episode "Harley and Ivy". The episode came from Dini wanting to make Harley a stronger character and write a story where she leaves the Joker; Dini decided to pair her up with Ivy because she was "the strongest contrast to Harley". The two later became close friends within the DC Animated Universe. Dini has stated that he could see a romantic relationship between the two happening the more he worked with the two characters, but the impossibility of properly portraying their relationship in a kids cartoon at the time prevented it from happening.

Prior to the New 52 reboot, Ivy is shown as having teamed up on occasion with Harley with Harley being her best friend and recurring ally. Unlike most villain team-ups, their partnership is based on genuine friendship and mutual respect. Ivy sincerely wants to save Harley from her unhealthy abusive relationship with the Joker. Accordingly, Poison Ivy despises the Joker, and the two exchange vicious banter at every opportunity. In the final storyline of the Gotham City Sirens series, Harley suggests that Ivy may be in love with her, an accusation that stuns her. The following issue has Poison Ivy acknowledge that she may indeed love Harley, but the details of her love are never specified, and the series ended with the New 52 reboot before their relationship could be addressed.

Conner and Palmiotti hinted at a romantic relationship in the New 52 Harley Quinn series, and later confirmed that Harley and Ivy are in a non-monogamous relationship. 2017's Harley Quinn #25 marked their first canonical kiss.

Character biography
DC Animated Universe

Harley Quinn first appeared in Batman: The Animated Series (1992–1995), voiced by Arleen Sorkin, who subsequently reprised her role in other DC Animated Universe series, including Superman: The Animated Series (1996–2000), The New Batman Adventures (1997–1999), Static Shock (2000–2004), and Justice League (2001–2004), as well as the film Batman Beyond: Return of the Joker (2000).

Originally a career-oriented psychologist, Dr. Harleen Quinzel's life took a radical turn when she chose to take an internship at Arkham Asylum for a semester of college. Convinced by the Joker himself to do it, Harleen interviewed him and learned he was abused as a child by his alcoholic father (later learning this backstory to have been one of several different stories he had told to others, some with different details each time), and after more interviews, determined Batman was the primary source of the Joker's anger and was to blame for his actions, but that she also had fallen in love with him. Harleen helped the Joker escape and, renaming herself Harley Quinn, became his sidekick in hopes that she could win his love, going on a crime spree across the United States of America.

After assisting Joker in attempting to assassinate Commissioner James Gordon by planting a bomb at a dinner in his honour, she was subdued by Batman, and subsequently an accomplice in virtually all of Joker's criminal schemes. On occasion, she would be kicked out of Joker's gang when unintentionally upstaging or annoying the Joker, on one of these occasions teaming up with Poison Ivy, with the two becoming close friends and a successful crime duo independently. While imprisoned on her own in Arkham Asylum, Batman offered her a pardon in exchange for helping him track down the Joker after he had stolen a nuclear bomb. The day she is declared rehabilitated and paroled, Harley's hyperactivity and unfamiliarity with the "real" world leads to her accidentally kidnap someone and be returned to Arkham yet again.

In the 31-episode Gotham Girls webtoon, Harley joins forces with Poison Ivy and Catwoman in a co-starring role.

After several failed attempts at rehabilitation, Harley returns to the Joker's side. However, after another failed attempt to kill Commissioner Gordon leads the Joker to forgetting their anniversary, Harley re-examines her life and decides that as Batman was the cause of the Joker's obsession, she should capture and kill him herself for him to kill, doing so by falsely pretending to have found sanity and luring Batman into a trap. Recognizing Harley to have come closer to killing him than Joker has ever done, Batman tricks her into facilitating his escape by making her call the Joker and tell him what she has done, knowing that he would not allow anyone other than himself to kill Batman, pushing her aside and unknowingly knocking her out a window. Recovering in Arkham, Harley decides that the Joker will never truly love her, before returning to her devotion upon seeing that he has left her a rose in a vase from him by her bedside table, with a note hoping that she gets better soon. Harley later references having convinced the Joker to attend couple's counseling with her.

In the film Batman Beyond: Return of the Joker, flashbacks reveal Harley's apparent final actions after returning to the Joker again were assisting him in kidnapping Tim Drake and torturing him into insanity to transform him into their son "J.J", so that they can start a family together. She later fought Batgirl who angrily chastised her for even helping Joker commit a heinous act but fell deep into an abyss, leading to the latter presuming her dead, though she survived as depicted in the present, where she appears at the end of the movie, revealed to be the grandmother of the Jokerz members, the Dee Dee Twins, who address her as "Nana Harley", having reformed from her life of crime.

DC Universe

Harleen Quinzel was a psychiatrist at Arkham Asylum, and after meeting the Joker, she became his frequent accomplice, took on the name Harley Quinn, and got in an abusive codependent relationship with him. She eventually splits up with him, and becomes a solo criminal, forming a criminal gang called the Quinntets. Following the Quinntet's dissolution, Harley Quinn moves to Metropolis with her best friend Poison Ivy, where she works as a love columnist in the Daily Planet under the alias Holly Chance. She then moves back to Gotham City, where she then voluntarily incarcerates herself in Arkham. Harley Quinn then spents a year applying for parole, only to see her request systematically rejected by Bruce Wayne, the layman member of Arkham's medical commission. She is kidnapped by Peyton Riley, the new female Ventriloquist, who offers her a job; Harley turns the job down out of respect for the memory of Arnold Wesker, the original Ventriloquist, who attempted to cheer her up during her first week in Arkham while the Joker was still on the loose. She then helps Batman and Commissioner Jim Gordon foil the impostor's plans. Although Riley escapes, Bruce Wayne is impressed with Harley's effort at redemption and agrees with granting her parole.  She then briefly joins the Secret Six, then decides to quit.

Final Crisis
During Countdown to Final Crisis, a reformed Harley Quinn resides in an Amazon-run women's shelter. Having abandoned her jester costume and clown make-up, she now only wears an Amazonian stola or chiton. She befriends the former Catwoman replacement Holly Robinson and then succeeds in persuading her to join her at the shelter, where she is working as an assistant. They are both brought to Themiscyra by "Athena" (really Granny Goodness) and begin Amazon training. Holly and Harley then meet the real Athena and encounter Mary Marvel. The group reveals Granny's deception, and Holly, Harley, and Mary follow her as she retreats to Apokolips. Mary finds the Olympian gods, whom Granny had been holding prisoner, and the group frees them. Harley is granted powers by Thalia as a reward. Upon returning to Earth, the powers vanish, and Harley and Holly return to Gotham City.

Gotham City Sirens

Harley Quinn then joins forces with Poison Ivy (Pamela Isley) and Catwoman (Selina Kyle) in the series Gotham City Sirens. In Gotham City Sirens #7, Harley Quinn visits her family in Bensonhurst, Brooklyn, during the holiday season. Harley's father is a swindler who is still in jail, and her brother, Barry, is a loser with dead-end dreams of rock stardom. Her mother, Sharon, wants her to stop the "villain and hero stuff." The dysfunctional, "horrible" experience while visiting family causes her to return home to the Sirens' shared Gotham City hideout where Harley, Catwoman, and Poison Ivy spend the rest of Christmas together. Following several adventures with Catwoman and Ivy, Harley betrays them and breaks into Arkham Asylum, intending to kill the Joker for his years of abuse towards her. However, Harley ultimately chooses instead to release the Joker from his cell, and together the two orchestrate a violent takeover of the facility that results in most of the guards and staff members either being killed or taken hostage by the inmates. Harley and the Joker are eventually defeated by Batman and Catwoman, and Harley is last seen being wheeled away while bound in a straitjacket and muzzle. Shortly afterward, Poison Ivy breaks into Harley's cell and attempts to kill her for her betrayal, but instead offers to free her if she helps her kill Catwoman, who had left both of her fellow Sirens behind in Arkham. Harley agrees, and the two set out to trap Catwoman. During the ensuing fight, Catwoman says she saw good in them and only wanted to help. As Batman is about to arrest them, Catwoman helps the two of them escape.

The New 52 and DC Rebirth
Like her previous incarnations, Harleen Quinzel was still the Joker's psychiatrist, but before she becomes Harley, the Joker pushes her into a vat of chemicals, bleaching her skin white and driving her insane. Harley Quinn is forced to join the Suicide Squad by Amanda Waller. Harley Quinn then leaves Gotham City and moves back to her hometown of Brooklyn and resides in Coney Island.

Infinite Frontier
Harley Quinn moves back to Gotham City in an attempt to reestablish herself as a hero, aiding the Batman Family and trying to make up for her past "where she often enabled the Joker".

Cultural impact

Harley Quinn has become one of DC Comics' most popular characters. The 2016 relaunch of her comic shipped more copies than any other DC Rebirth title and was one of the best-selling comics of the year. DC Comics Publisher Jim Lee refers to Harley Quinn as the fourth pillar in their publishing line, behind Superman, Batman, and Wonder Woman. Harley Quinn currently stars in four separate ongoing series — three eponymous titles and Suicide Squad. Only Batman and Superman have comparable numbers of monthly appearances, making Harley DC Comics' most prominent and profitable female character. Kevin Kiniry, vice-president of DC Collectibles, says Harley Quinn is always a top-seller and she "can go toe-to-toe with Batman and the Joker as one of the most fan-requested and sought-after characters." In 2016, Harley Quinn's Halloween costume ranked as the most popular costume in both the United States and the United Kingdom and it remains a popular subject for cosplay. To celebrate the character, DC Comics declared the month of February to be Harley Quinn Month and published 22 Harley Quinn variant covers across their line of comic books. IGN's 2009 list of the Top 100 Comic Book Villains of All Time ranked Harley Quinn as #45. She was ranked 16th in Comics Buyer's Guides 2011 "100 Sexiest Women in Comics" list. Joker voice actor Mark Hamill attributes the success of Harley Quinn to Arleen Sorkin's performance. On Twitter, he stated: "In the script she was just an unnamed Joker "hench-wench" w/ no discernible personality. When Arleen began reading her lines in that unforgettable voice so poignant & full of heart I nearly fell off my chair! She brought SO much more than was on the page & a legend was born."

Collected editions
This section lists the collected editions, from trade paperbacks to omnibus editions, of various comics in which Harley Quinn is mainly featured.
Ongoing series

DC Omnibuses

One-shots and limited series

DC Black Label
Harley Quinn stars in various series under DC Comics' adult-oriented Black Label imprint.

Other versions
 Harley Quinn's first major appearance outside the Batman animated world was in the Elseworlds miniseries Thrillkiller. This version of Harley is a schoolgirl named Hayley Fitzpatrick who dresses up to help a female version of the Joker called Bianca Steeplechase. After Batgirl kills Bianca, Harley is shown killing her own family, intent on revenge in the final frames of the story.
 In the Elseworlds 80-Page Giant, one of the stories is about Lex Luthor as a music producer. One of his groups is, as the press puts it, "alternative lifestyle folkies Ivy and Harley".
 On the new Earth-3, Harleen Quinzel is the Jokester's business manager and is killed by the Owlman.
 Harley appears in Batman/The Spirit. In this crossover, Harley is one of the many villains who helps try to take down the Batman and the Spirit. She initially appears disguised as a flight attendant.
 In the 2008 graphic novel Joker, Harley Quinn appears as the Joker's helper and aide-de-camp. She at one point acts as a stripper (though this may be a ruse) and is never shown speaking. In Batman: Damned, the sequel to Joker, Harley snaps after the Joker's mysterious death following a battle with Batman and performs surgery on herself and dressing herself to make her resemble the Joker. Harley leads the Joker's remaining henchman on a revenge mission, blowing up several buildings and taking over the GCPD building and defacing the Bat-Signal so that it resembles the Joker's smile. Batman arrives and defeats the henchman before Harley paralyzes him with a toxin, beats him with her baseball bat, and attempts to sexually abuse him. Batman is then possessed by the Enchantress and strangles Harley against the Bat-Signal.
 In the Ame-Comi Girls universe, Harley is partnered with the Catwoman and Poison Ivy as part of a trio of villains.
 The Flashpoint version of Harley Quinn is named Yo-Yo. She was a henchwoman of the Joker, and the Batman chased her down to find the Joker's location, as she had kidnapped Judge Dent's children. He chased her to the ledge of the building around Crime Alley. Batman drops her off the roof, but she is luckily saved by Cyborg.
 In Batman '66, a version of Harley Quinn designed more around the 1960s television show (she is slightly taller and her hair is short; she also wears prominent slanted glasses, a long red dress and red blouse, a large pearl necklace, and fairly prominent earrings) appears as Dr. Holly Quinn, Ph.D., a psychologist at Arkham Asylum, referred to as Arkham Institute for the Criminally Insane. She convinces the Joker to cooperate with Batman and Robin in exchange for approving his comedy night proposal. Dr. Quinn is manipulated by the Catwoman and the Joker to perfect the Joker Wave — a hysteria-inducing transmitting dish used on Gotham. Quinn is devastated by her role in the plot and to atone for her mistake, Dr. Quinn reverses the device by submitting herself to its effects — freeing the people of Gotham but sacrificing her sanity in the process. She escapes and becomes a supervillain named Harlequin, wearing a roller derby-inspired version of the classic Harley costume. She retains her considerable intelligence and psychological training, making her a difficult foe for the Dynamic Duo, but is eventually captured when Batman and Robin disguise themselves as criminals (Batman in his regular alternate guise of Matches Malone) who beat up other bad guys who were auditioning to be Holly's henchmen.
 Harley Quinn appears in the prequel comic to the game Injustice: Gods Among Us. She helps the Joker kidnaps Lois Lane and surgically plant a trigger in her heart that will set off a nuclear bomb in Metropolis should her heart stop; when Superman accidentally kills her (thinking she is Doomsday) he becomes devastated, with the grieving Superman killing the Joker as a result. Harley struggles to come to terms with the Joker's death but develops an attachment to the Green Arrow when he kidnaps her to protect her from Superman's wrath but is also grief-stricken when he is killed by Superman. She later confronts the Black Canary but hesitates upon realizing she is pregnant upon vomiting mid-battle and reveals to the Black Canary she has a four-year-old daughter named Lucy who lives with her sister. Harley and the Canary befriend each other as a result and Harley starts helping Batman's Insurgency, though most members distrust her due to her lover's actions. In Injustice 2, she helps to fight Grodd's Society and Brainiac alongside the Black Canary, the Green Arrow, and the other Justice League and Regime members. It is revealed in the ending she later joins the Justice League as a fully accepted member, though she occasionally has to deal with her violent impulses. It is also revealed her daughter thinks her mother is her Aunt Harley, though Harley hopes to one day tell her the truth.
 In the Batman/Teenage Mutant Ninja Turtles crossover, Harley is mutated into a humanoid hyena by the Shredder. She is knocked out by Batman during the battle at Arkham Asylum, and Splinter uses her hammer to take down the rest of the inmates. After the Shredder is defeated, the mutagen in her system decays naturally, causing her and the rest of the mutated inmates to revert to normal.
 In Batman: White Knight, it is revealed that Harley Quinn was two different women all along. The first Harley Quinn, Harleen Quinzel, quit when the Joker captured and tortured Robin (Jason Todd), and she was replaced by another girl, Marian Drews, without the Joker even realizing it. Once the Joker was cured of his insanity, he proposes marriage to Harley, only for her to beat him and mock him for acting "normal". The original Harley Quinn then appears, kicks the "fake Harley" unconscious, and reveals to Jack Napier (the Joker's true identity in this continuity) there were two Harleys all along. While Harleen loved the Joker "despite his flaws", Marian loved the Joker by "his flaws". She accepts his marriage proposal and joins him in his quest to rid Gotham City of Batman. Drews then takes the mantle of the Joker for herself "until the real Joker returns", calls herself the Neo Joker, and later romances Poison Ivy.Batman: White Knight #3
In DC Comics Bombshells, Harley fell in with the Joker (in this version, a gangster) after leaving Charm School, but left him when he began his journey into the occult. By the time of the events of the story, Harley is drawn to England by a voice she believes is the Joker, but turns out to be the Joker's Daughter. She rejects the Joker's Daughter's attempt to have the Joker resurrected in the body of Poison Ivy, instead of beginning a relationship with Ivy herself.
 In the Marvel Comics series Gwenpool Strikes Back, a variant of Gwen Poole based on Harley Quinn (from Civil War II) is introduced as a member of the GwenHive, dubbed "Harley Gwen".
In DCeased, an alternate universe wherein a virus spreads around the world that turns people into zombie-like creatures, Harley Quinn kills a zombie Joker and convinces Ivy to let what was left of the human race take shelter in Ivy's territory.
In Batman '89, an alternative continuation of Tim Burton's Batman (1989) and Batman Returns (1992), a blonde psychiatrist called Dr. Q. appears in a talk show to discuss about the psychology of masks. Bruce Wayne, who's in the Batcave watching the show, gets angered by her comments and asks Aflred to turn the sound mute. The woman is shown wearing a black and red suit and lozenge shapped earrings (just like in Harley Quinn's classic costume).

In other media
Television
Live action
 In 2002, a short-lived television series, Birds of Prey, an alternate continuation of Batman Returns, included Harley Quinn as a psychologist and the main antagonist, portrayed by actress Mia Sara. In this show, Harleen Quinzel uses her day job as a psychologist to take control of the city of New Gotham. She does not wear a costume, although she does wear an outfit that is reminiscent of her cartoon costume in the series finale "Devil's Eyes".
Harley Quinn made a cameo appearance in the Arrow season two episode "Suicide Squad", voiced again by Tara Strong, while physically portrayed by Cassidy Alexa (credited as "Deranged Squad Female"). Series star Stephen Amell revealed in an interview she was set to appear in the season two finale episode "Unthinkable", but was cut due to time. The show's producer Andrew Kreisberg revealed there were plans for the character to appear, but series actress Willa Holland stated they had been axed due to the Suicide Squad film.Archived at Ghostarchive and the Wayback Machine:  Harley was mentioned by Kiki Roulette in the Batwoman episode "Broken Toys".
A character loosely based on Harley Quinn named Ecco appears in the fourth and fifth seasons of Gotham, portrayed by Francesca Root-Dodson. Like Quinn, Ecco wears a black and red outfit, clown makeup, and roller-skates, refers to other characters as "Puddin", and is completely devoted and infatuated with Jeremiah Valeska, the show's incarnation of the Joker; additionally, the character of Barbara Kean, portrayed by Erin Richards, was also modelled off of Quinn during their appearance in the fourth season, while Meggie Vilcina portrays a young Harleen Quinzel, whose family Bruce Wayne (David Mazouz) rescues, in the final moments of the third season finale "Heavydirtysoul", dressed in black and red. Following Ecco's death in "The Beginning...", Jeremiah mentions that "there are always other fish in the sea."

Animation
 Harley Quinn appears in The Batman, voiced by Hynden Walch. This version is a former television pop-psychiatrist who also ends up being seduced by the Joker, sharing a normal relationship.
 Harley Quinn appears in Batman: The Brave and the Bold, voiced by Meghan Strange.
 Harley Quinn makes several cameos in Teen Titans Go!.
 Harley Quinn appears in Justice League Action, voiced by Tara Strong.
 Harley Quinn appears in the 2019 animated series DC Super Hero Girls, voiced again by Tara Strong. This version is a fangirl of the Joker and Barbara Gordon's best friend from Gotham City, though they are unaware of each other's identities until "Nightmare in Gotham". While initially living at Gotham, she moves to Metropolis in "#Frenemies Part 1", and becomes friends and partners with Catwoman, Poison Ivy, Giganta, Star Sapphire, and Livewire, while also becoming an enemy of the DC Super Hero Girls.

Harley Quinn

 In 2017, it was reported Warner Bros. Animation had ordered 26 half-hour episodes of an adult-oriented Harley Quinn animated series for their new streaming service, DC Universe. In 2018, it was announced that Kaley Cuoco would provide Harley Quinn's voice, and a short teaser trailer was released. The series officially began streaming in 2019. It focuses on Harley as she "attempts to make it on her own as the criminal Queenpin of Gotham City", and step out of the Joker's shadow with the help of Poison Ivy and her crew of supervillains.

Film
Live action
Harley Quinn was initially set to appear in Batman Unchained, the fifth film planned for the original Batman film series. She was to be featured as the Joker's (Jack Nicholson) daughter, who allies herself with the Scarecrow to get revenge on Batman for her father's death. However, due to the critical and commercial failure of Batman & Robin, this film was cancelled.
The Batman: Arkham version of Harley makes a cameo appearance in the 2018 film Ready Player One.
On August 4, 2022, Lady Gaga was confirmed to be set to play Quinn in the 2024 film Joker: Folie à Deux.

DC Extended Universe

Margot Robbie portrays Dr. Harleen Quinzel / Harley Quinn in the DC Extended Universe.
The character debuted in the 2016 film Suicide Squad. Paul Dini, the creator of Harley Quinn, said Robbie "nailed" her role.
Harley Quinn appears in the 2020 spin-off film Birds of Prey, which Robbie also produced. On Robbie's portrayal of the character in the movie, Dini stated, "I think they really got the essence of the character down, and they made her quite a lot of fun and appealing in so many ways. She’s not totally the animated version, and it’s not totally the Jimmy [Palmiotti] and Amanda [Conner] version, but it kind of borrows from all of them and creates its own reality and its own fun. There are so many moments in that movie that I just think are wonderful. [...] When I saw her running, laughing hysterically, pushing a shopping cart full of Peeps, I said, "That’s my girl." All those little impish things that she did in the movie – sitting down eating cereal, watching Tweety Bird cartoons, and just kind of skipping through life cheerfully oblivious of the devastation she’s caused – that’s Harley."
Harley Quinn appeared in the film The Suicide Squad (2021), a standalone sequel to Suicide Squad.

Animation
Harley Quinn has a cameo appearance in Justice League: The New Frontier during a speech by John F. Kennedy.
An alternate universe version of Harley Quinn appears in Justice League: Crisis on Two Earths. This version is a monkey of "The Jester" (the film version of the Joker).
Harley Quinn is featured in Batman: Assault on Arkham, voiced by Hynden Walch.
Harley Quinn appears in Lego DC Comics Super Heroes: Justice League: Gotham City Breakout with Tara Strong reprising her role.
Harley Quinn appears in Batman and Harley Quinn, voiced by Melissa Rauch. She works as a waitress after breaking up with the Joker again, and helps Batman and Nightwing stop Poison Ivy from accidentally causing the extinction of all life on Earth. 
Dr. Harleen Quinzel appears in Batman vs. Two-Face, voiced by Sirena Irwin. She is the assistant to Hugo Strange, who reciprocates the Joker's flirting. In a Blu-ray exclusive bonus scene, Quinzel, dressed as Harley Quinn, busts the Joker out of prison.
Harley Quinn appears in DC Super Heroes vs. Eagle Talon, voiced by Kang Ji-young.The Brave and the Bold version of Harley Quinn appears in Scooby-Doo! & Batman: The Brave and the Bold, with Tara Strong voicing her.
A feudal Japanese version of Harley Quinn appears in the anime film Batman Ninja, voiced by Rie Kugimiya and Tara Strong in Japanese and English respectively.
Harley Quinn appears in Teen Titans Go! To the Movies. She has a cameo appearance in an altered future where the villains have taken over.
Harley Quinn appears in Batman vs. Teenage Mutant Ninja Turtles, with Tara Strong reprising her role. Harley is first introduced as an inmate at Arkham, who mocks Shredder from inside her cell. After the Joker frees her, she is mutated into a crazy and anthropomorphic hyena and assists her lover in fighting the Bat-family and the Turtles. She is knocked out by a crazed and mutated Batman, and abandoned by the Joker as he attempts to escape. She was presumably demutated by the Gotham police.
Dr. Harleen Quinzel makes a non-speaking cameo appearance in Batman: Death in the Family.
Harley Quinn has a cameo appearance in Space Jam: A New Legacy on a train that LeBron James and Bugs Bunny are on while searching the DC World in the “Serververse” for the Toons.
Harley Quinn appears in the animated film Injustice, voiced by Gillian Jacobs.
Harley Quinn appears in Teen Titans Go! & DC Super Hero Girls: Mayhem in the Multiverse, with Tara Strong reprising her role. Following the events leading up to the second season of the series, Harley joins the Legion of Doom, created by Lex Luthor to get rid of all of the superheroes and take over the world using the Amulet of Cythonna. However, she disagreed with Luthor and the Legion's plan, and left the villains after helping Wonder Woman escape, now that she knew her friend's identity as Batgirl. And inspired by Bumblebee's speech, she decides to help the heroes defeat Cythonna and the Legion of Doom. After their success, the Super Hero Girls end up accepting Harleen in their team.

DC Animated Movie Universe

The Flashpoint version of Harley Quinn named Yo-Yo appears in Justice League: The Flashpoint Paradox, voiced by Hynden Walch.
Harley Quinn appears in Suicide Squad: Hell to Pay, with Tara Strong reprising her role. Again, she is a member of the Suicide Squad and is primarily designed after her appearance in The New 52.
Harley Quinn appears in Batman: Hush and Justice League Dark: Apokolips War, with Hynden Walch reprising her role. In Apokolips War, she is shown to have become the new leader of the Suicide Squad following Amanda Waller's death by cancer and seeks to avenge the death of Joker, who was apparently killed by Batman, who at the time was under Darkseid's control.

Lego Batman

Harley Quinn appears in Lego Batman: The Movie – DC Super Heroes Unite, an adaptation of the video game of the same name, with Laura Bailey reprising her role.
Harley Quinn appears in The Lego Batman Movie, voiced by Jenny Slate.
Harley Quinn appears in The Lego Movie 2: The Second Part, voiced by Margot Rubin.

Web series
 Harley Quinn appears in the Batman Black and White motion comics, voiced by Janyse Jaud.
 Harley Quinn (credited as Harlequin) appears in the first episode of the web series Justice League: Gods and Monsters Chronicles, in which she kidnaps and mutilates an unknown number of people and makes toys and dolls out of the bodies. She fights Batman after he frees her latest victim and ends up surrendering, only to be drained of her blood and possibly killed after Batman reveals his fangs to her. She is voiced by Tara Strong reprising her role from the Arkham franchise.
 Harley Quinn appears in the web series DC Super Hero Girls, in which she is a student at Super Hero High and the roommate of Wonder Woman. Unusually for the character, she is portrayed as a hero instead of a villain and has a mostly positive relationship with her superhero counterparts. She is once again voiced by Tara Strong.

Podcasts
 Harley, voiced by Gillian Jacobs, is introduced in the first season of the Batman: The Audio Adventures podcast, taking on a larger role in season 2.
 In 2023, Spotify and DC Comics released Harley Quin and The Joker: Sound Mind, a seven-episode podcast featuring Christina Ricci voicing Harley Quinn and Billy Magnussen as The Joker.

Video games
 DC Animated Universe games 
 Harley cameos in The Adventures of Batman & Robin for the Super NES, and as a boss in The Adventures of Batman & Robin for the Sega Genesis.
 She appears in The Adventures of Batman & Robin for the Sega CD and Batman: Chaos in Gotham, voiced by Arleen Sorkin.
 Harley Quinn appears in Batman Vengeance, voiced by Arleen Sorkin. At the beginning of the game, Harley dons a mask and wig to pose as a single mother named "Mary Flynn". As Flynn, she tricks Batman into rescuing her "son" from the Joker so he can lure the Caped Crusader into a trap. Batman seemingly fails to stop the Joker from falling to his death off Gotham Bridge when his scheme fails, and when Harley attempts suicide out of grief, he saves her. Afterwards, Harley gives up her life of crime and even assists Batman in his investigation of several other unusual crimes across Gotham. In the final phase of the game, it was revealed the Joker is alive and faked his death as part of a bigger plan to destroy the city; Harley was aware of this from the beginning and did her part to make sure that Batman would follow the clues Joker left.
Harley appears in the sequel Batman: Rise of Sin Tzu where she is locked in her Arkham Asylum cell, being paralyzed by Sin Tzu's mind control.

 DC Universe Online 
Harley appears in the DC Universe Online video game, with Arleen Sorkin returning as her voice. Harley is the basic Legends PVP character granted to Villains without having to spend Marks of Legend.

 Lego series 
 Harley Quinn appears in Lego Batman: The Videogame, voiced by Grey DeLisle. She appears as an enemy of Batman, a 1st deputy of the Joker, and the second boss of Chapter 3 "The Joker's Return".Game Informer magazine  features a two-page gallery of the many heroes and villains who appear in the game with a picture for each character and a descriptive paragraph. See "LEGO Batman: Character Gallery", Game Informer 186 (October 2008): 93. Harley Quinn in Lego Batman is a playable character, can be unlocked through the villain levels and carries a pistol and her giant mallet. She is one of three bosses that later appear as minibosses, the other two being Two-Face and Catwoman.
 Harley Quinn appears in Lego Batman 2: DC Super Heroes, voiced by Laura Bailey. She first appears as the first miniboss in "Theatrical Pursuits". In "Arkham Asylum Antics", she rides with the Riddler and Two-Face on the latter's truck. She also appears as a boss at the Gotham Funland entrance.
 Harley Quinn appears in Lego Batman 3: Beyond Gotham, voiced by Tara Strong. She has two side-quests in the Hall of Doom, after which she is unlocked as a playable character.
 Harley Quinn is a playable character in Lego Dimensions, with Tara Strong reprising the role.
 Harley Quinn serves as one of the main characters in Lego DC Super-Villains, voiced again by Tara Strong. Her design is based on The New 52.

 Batman: Arkham series 
Harley Quinn appears in the Batman: Arkham franchise. While Arleen Sorkin reprised her role from the DC Animated Universe in the first installment, she was replaced by Tara Strong for the rest of the series.
 In Batman: Arkham Asylum, she takes control of the eponymous asylum to facilitate the Joker's escape, and makes subsequent appearances throughout the game; kidnapping Warden Quincy Sharp and Commissioner Gordon, releasing Poison Ivy from her cell, and attempting to kill Batman on the Joker's orders. After Batman defeats Harley, he locks her up in a vacant cell, where she remains for the rest of the storyline. In this game, Harley wears an original nurse-themed costume.
 In Batman: Arkham City, she continues to work with the Joker within the eponymous city-prison, making several appearances throughout the main story. Following the Joker's death due to his Titan-inflicted disease, Harley watches in shock as Batman carries his lifeless body outside Arkham City. In this game, Harley wears a biker-girl themed costume, using a low-key version of her usual makeup, with heavy eye shadow in lieu of her domino mask. 
Harley also appears in the Harley Quinn's Revenge expansion pack, set after the events of the main story, wherein she seeks revenge on Batman for the Joker's death. After taking several police officers hostage in Arkham City to lure Batman into a trap, she manages to capture him, but is ultimately defeated after Robin rescues Batman. By this point, Harley has taken full control of the Joker's gang, and has an adopted a new look: mostly black clothes, with hair dyed black, a mourning veil, and a "J" necklace.
 Harley Quinn appears in the mobile game Batman: Arkham City Lockdown, set before the events of Arkham City, where she takes a reporter a hostage to ransom her for the Joker's release from prison. After luring Batman into a trap, she tries to execute the bound and gagged reporter but is stopped by one of Batman's batarangs.
 Dr. Harleen Quinzel appears in Batman: Arkham Origins, which takes place before her transformation into Harley Quinn. She interviews the Joker at Blackgate Prison and falls in love with him after he confesses his fascination with someone whom he considers special to him (with Harley believing the Joker is talking about her, when in reality he is thinking of Batman). She later appears amongst the prison's other staff members held hostage by the Joker when he takes over the facility, but she is rescued by Batman. Quinzel is last seen escorting the Joker to his cell after he is defeated by Batman.
 Harley returns in Batman: Arkham Knight. Still in charge of the remains of the Joker's gang and vengeful against Batman, she is recruited by the Scarecrow to assist him in his plot to kill the Dark Knight. Harley discovers Batman and Robin's hideout at the abandoned Panessa Studios, where the two are keeping the victims of the Joker's blood transfusion who were not affected by the cure under observation. She leads her gang to invade the hideout and release the Joker patients, but is foiled after one of them betrays her and kills the others before committing suicide. Harley is then locked up by Batman in one of the Joker victims' cells left vacant, where she remains for the rest of the storyline. In this game, she wears a modified version of her Arkham City costume.
 Apart from the main game, she is a playable character via downloadable content. She was included in her self-titled expansion pack, which also features four challenge maps and a story-driven mission for the character, set shortly before the events of Arkham Knight, wherein she breaks into the Blüdhaven Police Headquarters to free Poison Ivy on Scarecrow's orders. Harley has several unique gagdets at her disposal, including her baseball bat, explosive jack-in-the-box, and laughing gas, as well as a variant of Detective Mode, called Psychosis Mode, which allows the player to see enemies and objects of interest through walls; when the player keeps Psychosis Mode active for an extended period of time, the character's Harleen and Harley personas can be heard fighting for control of her body. Harley also appears as a boss in the Batgirl: A Matter of Family DLC mission, set before the events of Arkham Asylum, in which she dons her classic jester costume.
 Harley appears as a playable character in the mobile game Batman: Arkham Underworld. She is unlocked after the player completes a mission for her, and wields a special pistol, grenades, and a baseball bat. She can also summon her pet hyenas.
 Harley will appear as a playable character in Suicide Squad: Kill the Justice League. In the game, she is part of the Suicide Squad assembled by Amanda Waller to eliminate Brainiac and the members of the Justice League brainwashed by him in Metropolis.

 Injustice series 
 Harley Quinn appears as a playable fighter in Injustice: Gods Among Us, voiced by Tara Strong. In the alternate universe depicted in the game, Quinn establishes the Joker Clan to honor the Clown Prince of Crime after he is murdered by Superman. She is part of Batman's Insurgency and is tempted in the story to revert to her older ways when an alternate Joker arrives in her dimension until Lex Luthor manages to convince her the Joker is manipulating her for his ends. In her arcade ending, she fatally slits the Joker's throat after a wedding gone wrong.
 Harley Quinn appears as a playable fighter in Injustice 2, with Tara Strong reprising her role. She is a main character in the single-player campaign, wherein she serves as one of Batman's most trustworthy allies, and assists him and the other heroes in combating Brainiac and the Society, which includes Poison Ivy. Harley is also shown to have completely overcome her feelings for the Joker after realizing he had been controlling and abusing her for years. In her arcade ending, she is offered a position within the Justice League and admits that she still has violent impulses from time to time, but manages to keep them under control by being heroic and spending time with her daughter Lucy (who believes her to be her aunt, though Harley hopes to tell her the truth someday).

 Batman: The Enemy Within 
Harley Quinn appears in Batman: The Enemy Within (the sequel to Batman: The Telltale Series), voiced by Laura Post. This version of Dr. Harleen Quinzel was driven insane following her father's long bout with mental illness and eventual suicide. Attempting to avoid her father's fate, she joins a criminal organization called the Pact to steal a virus able to cure her hereditary condition. This depiction initially reverses the dynamic between Harley and the Joker. Quinn manipulates and abuses her former patient at Arkham Asylum, named "John Doe", who is infatuated with her. As the series progresses, John's confidence will increase, and depending on the player's choices, he will either aid Bruce Wayne in capturing Quinn or transform into the traditional version of the Joker. In the latter outcome, Harley will become the Joker's girlfriend and the two use the virus to threaten Gotham City.

 Other appearances 
 Harley Quinn appears in Infinite Crisis as a playable character, voiced by Tara Strong.
 Harley Quinn is among the villains summoned by Brainiac to retrieve Starites in Scribblenauts Unmasked.
 Harley Quinn appears as a playable character in the mobile game, Suicide Squad: Special Ops, based on the film.
 She appears as a playable character in DC Legends and DC Unchained.
 In Mortal Kombat 11, Harley Quinn appears as a DLC costume skin for Cassie Cage.
 Harley Quinn is a usable cosmetic outfit Fortnite.
 Harley Quinn appears as a playable character in SINoALICE, voiced by Rie Kugimiya.
 Harley Quinn appears as a playable character in the mobile game, DC Battle Arena, voiced by Kira Buckland.
 Harley Quinn is a playable character in MultiVersus, voiced by Tara Strong.
 Harley Quinn appears in Gotham Knights, voiced by Kari Wahlgren.
 Harley Quinn appears in the HBO Max podcast series Batman: The Audio Adventures, voiced by Gillian Jacobs.
 Harley Quinn appears in the Spotify podcast series Harley Quinn and The Joker: Sound Mind, voiced by Christina Ricci.

Novels
Harley Quinn has her own novel adaptation from comics as part of the DC Comic Novels series. Mad Love was released in November 2018 and written by Pat Cardigan and original co-creator Paul Dini and published by Titan Books.

In 2022, Penguin Random House launched a Harley Quinn line of their young adult DC Icons series, authored by YA author and neuroscientist Rachael Allen.

She is reinterpreted as Pauline Ketch in The Refrigerator Monologues''.

Actresses

See also
 Hybristophilia
 List of Batman family enemies

References

Sources

Further reading

External links

Harley Quinn at Comic Vine

 
Action film villains
Animated human characters
Villains in animated television series
Television characters introduced in 1992
Animated characters introduced in 1992
Batman: The Animated Series characters
Batman characters
Characters created by Paul Dini
Characters created by Bruce Timm
DC Comics sidekicks
Comics characters introduced in 1993
DC Animated Universe original characters
DC Comics characters with superhuman strength
DC Comics female superheroes
DC Comics female supervillains
DC Comics LGBT supervillains
DC Comics LGBT superheroes
DC Comics scientists
DC Comics titles
Female characters in animated series
Female characters in television
Fictional American psychiatrists
Fictional bisexual females
Fictional characters with personality disorders
Fictional characters with superhuman durability or invulnerability
Fictional clowns
Fictional clubfighters
Fictional female doctors
Fictional female scientists
Fictional gymnasts
Fictional jesters
Fictional Jewish women
Fictional hammer fighters
Fictional mad scientists
Fictional psychologists
Fictional therapists
Fighting game characters
Jewish superheroes
Joker (character)
LGBT characters in animated television series
LGBT characters in animation
Supervillains with their own comic book titles
Fictional American Jews in comics
Fictional victims of domestic abuse
Female characters in animation
Fictional characters from New York City
Suicide Squad members
Vigilante characters in comics
Fictional female murderers
Fictional mass murderers
Harlequin